Félix Biet (1838 in Langres, Haute-Marne – 1901 in Saint-Cyr-au-Mont-d'Or) was a French missionary from Paris Foreign Missions Society and naturalist.

Life
Biet was born in 1838. He was ordained as a priest in 1864. He was next sent to Tatsienlu in Tibet (called Dartsedo by Tibetans) as a missionary and he became the Bishop of the Apostolic Vicariate of Thibet, now Diocese of Kangding, in 1898. Félix Biet collected butterflies for Charles Oberthür who dedicated three new species (Thecla bieti, Pantoporia bieti and Anthocharis bieti) to him. Alphonse Milne-Edwards described the Chinese mountain cat (Felis bieti) and the black snub-nosed monkey, (Rhinopithecus bieti), the latter collected and sent by Jean-André Soulié. The Biet's laughingthrush a Chinese endemic species was another discovery, named by Émile Oustalet in 1897. Those natural history collections from Tibet and China are in the National Museum of Natural History in Paris.

He was succeeded by Pierre-Philippe Giraudeau.

See also 
 Catholic Church in Sichuan
 Christianity in Tibet

References
Adrien Launay (1916),  Mémorial de la Société des missions étrangères
Françoise Fauconnet-Buzelin (2012), Les Martyrs oubliés du Tibet. Chronique d'une rencontre manquée (1855-1940), éd. du Cerf, coll. Petit Cerf, Paris, 2012, 656 pages

1838 births
1901 deaths
People from Langres
French entomologists
French ornithologists
French Roman Catholic missionaries
Roman Catholic missionaries in China
Roman Catholic missionaries in Tibet
Roman Catholic missionaries in Sichuan
Paris Foreign Missions Society missionaries
French expatriates in China